The Maremma Regional Park (Italian: Parco Regionale della Maremma), also known as Uccellina Park (Parco dell'Uccellina), covers a coastal area between Principina a Mare and Talamone in the province of Grosseto, right up to the Livorno-Roma train line. The park covers  plus an extra  of open land around its boundaries, and it is included in the municipalities of Grosseto, Magliano in Toscana and Orbetello.

The Park is characterized by important geographical elements such as the last stretch of the river Ombrone, the orographic system of the Uccellina Mountains which reaches  of height in Poggio Lecci, the marsh area of Trappola, and the coast which is both sandy and characterized by steep cliffs.

References

External links 
Official web site of Maremma Regional Park 

Parks in Tuscany
Regional parks of Italy
Nature reserves in Italy